This was the first edition of the tournament.

Thiago Agustín Tirante won the title after defeating Juan Pablo Varillas 7–5, 7–5 in the final.

Seeds

Draw

Finals

Top half

Bottom half

References

External links
Main draw
Qualifying draw

Ambato La Gran Ciudad - 1